Alan Stokes (born 19 January 1981) is a British professional surfer and surf model from Newquay, Cornwall. He won the 2009 UK Pro Surf Tour Championships.

He is a model for surf clothing in the UK. He is sponsored by Animal Clothing & Wetsuits, Creatures of Leisure Hardware, Quiver Surfboards, Luke Hart Shapes, Future Fins, and Maxi Muscle.

Results/achievements
2003 Animal Beach Ball Shortboard Overall 1st
2004 British Pro Tour Shortboard Overall 1st
2004 British National Championships Shortboard Overall 1st
2004 Animal Beach Ball Shortboard Overall 1st
2004 UK Pro Surf Tour Champion
2005 English National Championships Shortboard Overall 1st
2005 Animal Beach Ball Shortboard Overall 1st
2005 British Pro Tour Newquay Shortboard Overall 1st
2005 British National Championships Shortboard Overall 1st
2006 British Pro Tour event three Shortboard Overall 1st
2009 Relentless Boardmasters 5th
2009 UK Pro Surf Tour Champion

References

External links and sources
Profile
Surf Newquay
UK based blog

Living people
English male models
British surfers
1981 births